Clara Thalmann ( Clara Ensner; 1908–1987) was an anarchist and fighter in the Spanish Civil War.

Life 

Clara Ensner was born in Basel, Switzerland, in 1908. She met Paul Thalmann through the publication Basler Volwarts in 1928. They were ejected from the communist party the next year. They traveled to Spain in 1936, where Ensner intended to compete in the People's Olympiad, which was canceled with the start of the Spanish Civil War. They fought alongside anarcho-syndicalists in the Durruti Column and were captured by communists the next year. During World War II, they assisted German refugees living in Paris and participated in pro-Algeria activism. They started a guesthouse in Nice, France, and participated in student activism during the 1960s and 1970s. In their later life, they contributed to documentaries about their lives and published their personal memoirs. She died in Nice in 1987.

Notes

References

Further reading 

 Alba, Víctor & Stephen Schwartz, Spanish Marxism vs Soviet Communism: A History of the P.O.U.M, Transaction Publishers, 1988,  p. 124

External links 

 Paul Thalmann/Clara Thalmann Papers at the International Institute of Social History

1908 births
1987 deaths
Swiss anarchists
Swiss expatriates in Spain
Swiss people of the Spanish Civil War
Swiss people of German descent
People from Basel-Stadt
Swiss newspaper editors
Foreign volunteers in the Spanish Civil War
Prisoners and detainees of Spain
Swiss people imprisoned abroad
French Resistance members
Female resistance members of World War II
Women in the Spanish Civil War
Swiss expatriates in France
Swiss memoirists
Deaths from lung cancer
Women memoirists
Women newspaper editors
20th-century Swiss women writers
20th-century French women writers
20th-century Swiss journalists
20th-century French journalists
Swiss women journalists
French women journalists
Women war correspondents
20th-century memoirists
Swiss Anti-Francoists